Episteme is a philosophical term referring to knowledge, science or understanding. It may also refer to:

Galaktion and Episteme
Episteme (moth), a genus of moths of the family Noctuidae
Episteme: A Journal of Individual and Social Epistemology, an academic journal